Jack Daly (born 12 August 1998) is an Irish rugby union player for United Rugby Championship and Champions Cup side Munster. He plays in the back-row and represents Garryowen in the All-Ireland League.

Early life
Born in Currans, County Kerry, Daly first began playing rugby for Castleisland, and won representation for Munster at under-18, under-19 and under-20/development level, before going on to join Limerick club Garryowen.

Munster
Daly made his first appearance for Munster A in their 2017–18 British and Irish Cup quarter-final defeat against Leinster A on 30 March 2018, and went on the join the Munster academy ahead of the 2018–19 season. He made five appearances for Munster A during the 2018–19 Celtic Cup during his first season in the academy, as well as starting in Munster A's 53–49 defeat against Leinster A in the Cara Cup, hosted in Weymouth, Massachusetts, in April 2019. He made his senior competitive debut for Munster in their 2020–21 Pro14 round 8 fixture against Italian side Zebre on 30 November 2020, coming on as a 57th minute replacement for Chris Cloete in the province's 52–3 win.

Daly joined the senior squad on a one-year contract from the 2021–22 season, and signed a two-year contract extension in January 2022. He made his European debut for Munster in their 2021–22 Champions Cup quarter-final defeat against French defending champions Toulouse on 7 May 2022.

Ireland
Having missed out on selection initially, Daly was called up to the Ireland under-20s squad for the 2018 World Rugby Under 20 Championship as a replacement for injured fellow Munsterman Jack O'Sullivan, and he went on to make his debut for the team in their 24–20 defeat against Georgia on 7 June 2018, before going on to start in the loss to Scotland, in which he scored a try, and the win against Japan, as Ireland finished 9th in the tournament.

Daly was selected in the Ireland Sevens squad for 2019 London Sevens in May 2019, his first call-up to the squad. He was retained in the squad for the 2019 Paris Sevens.

References

External links
Munster Senior Profile
Munster Academy Profile

URC Profile

1998 births
Living people
Rugby union players from County Kerry
Irish rugby union players
Garryowen Football Club players
Munster Rugby players
Ireland international rugby sevens players
Rugby union flankers
Rugby union number eights